Alu-Oshaeraen is a shrine in Nigeria.

Alu is the Esan word that means shrine or temple. Araen is the Esan word that means blood. Alu-Oshaeraen or Alu_Okhaeraen literally means shrine of blood. It is a mysterious shrine at the borders of Idunwele and Eguare in Ewu. It is believed that the shrine was previously a lake which fled the place to somewhere in Agbede when an injustice was done. The shrine is the spiritual centre for the religion of the people of Idunwele Ewu. The shrine is guarded by the families of Ugbekhilu or Ubene in Idunwele.

Edo State
Religious buildings and structures in Nigeria
Shrines